HMS Mermaid was a Hawthorn Leslie three-funnel, 30 knot destroyer ordered by the Royal Navy under the 1896 – 1897 Naval Estimates. She was launched in 1898, served during World War I and was sold for breaking in 1919.

Construction and career
She was laid down on 7 September 1896 at the R.W. Hawthorn Leslie and Company shipyard at Hebburn-on-Tyne and launched on 22 February 1898. During her builder's trials she made her contract speed of 30 knots. She was completed and accepted by the Royal Navy in June 1899.

She served as flagship for Commander John Green when he took command of the flotilla on 13 June 1901. She was deployed in home waters for her entire service life except for a brief visit to Gibraltar in 1910.

On 30 August 1912 the Admiralty directed all destroyer classes were to be designated by letters starting with 'A'. Since her design speed was 30 knots and she had three funnels, she was assigned to the C class. After 30 September 1913 she was known as a C-class destroyer and had the letter ‘C’ painted on the hull below the bridge area and on either the fore or aft funnel.

World War I
In July 1914 she was in active commission in the 6th Destroyer Flotilla tendered to  based at Dover. On 28 October 1914 under the command of Lieutenant P Percival she was part of the anti-submarine screen for operations off the Belgian Coast. In November 1917 she was redeployed to the 7th Destroyer Flotilla based on the Humber where she would finish the war. She was awarded the battle honour "Belgian Coast 1914 – 17".

In 1919 she was paid off and laid-up in reserve awaiting disposal.   She was sold on 23 July 1919 to Thos. W. Ward of Sheffield for breaking at New Holland, Lincolnshire, on the Humber Estuary.

Pennant numbers

Notes

References

Bibliography

External links
 http://www.gwpda.org/naval/s0420000.htm

Ships built on the River Tyne
1898 ships
C-class destroyers (1913)
World War I destroyers of the United Kingdom